XHJM-FM is a radio station on 88.1 FM in Monterrey, Nuevo León< Mexico. It is owned by the Universidad Regiomontana, operated by MVS Radio.

History
XEJM-AM 1450 received its concession on January 29, 1957. It was owned by the Garza family doing business as Radio Regiomontana, S.A. and originally was "Joyas Musicales", Monterrey's classical music station and sister to XET-AM 990. Other musical genres began to appear on the station as the 1960s began, and in 1963, XEJM ended its classical phase.

XEJM was sold to a Multimedios Radio concessionaire in 2004. The concessionaire changed to Radio Contenidos in 2011. During much of this time, the station served as an AM simulcast of XET-FM 94.1.

U-ERRE took over XEJM in 2017 after acquiring the station in October 2016. During this time, the station was U-ERRE Radio, with programming hosted and directed by university students. The AM station broadcast with 5,000 watts day and 1,000 watts night.

On Monday, June 18, 2018, XHJM-FM 88.1 signed on the air, migrating XEJM to FM. Coinciding with the move, MVS Radio began operating XHJM, with U-ERRE Radio becoming online-only; though it did not immediately announce a new format, TuneIn was updated with information indicating that MVS would bring its heritage FM Globo brand, which had been on just two stations at the start of the year, to XHJM. The AM station was turned off in June 2019 after the required year of simulcasting.

References

Mass media in Monterrey
MVS Radio